Böddenstedt is a village in the municipality of Suderburg in the collective municipality of Suderburg and lies in southwest of the district of Uelzen in the German state of Lower Saxony.

Geography 
The farming and handicrafts village of Böddenstedt lies between Hamburg and Hanover in the middle of the Lüneburg Heath. The Stahlbach stream – formerly also called the Böddenstedter Aue – flows along the southern edge of the village from west to east and is accompanied by fish ponds and a flat countryside of meadows and pasture. Böddenstedt has the form of a Haufendorf or irregularly nucleated village.

Personalities 
 Klaus Wiswe (born 30 October 1955 in Böddenstedt), German politician (CDU), full-time chief executive (Landrat) of the district of Celle, chairman of the Lower Saxon District Committee (Niedersächsischer Landkreistag)

References

External links 

Uelzen (district)
Villages in Lower Saxony
Lüneburg Heath